Paul Scott, sometimes known as Paul von Scott, is a British comics writer and games designer who is very active in the British small press comics scene.

Biography
Paul attended the University of Birmingham, where he studied geology.

He produces Solar Wind as well Big War Comic, Sunny For Girls, Omnivistascope and Warlock Holmes. In addition he has written for various other small press publications including FutureQuake, Something Wicked, The End Is Nigh and Starscape. He now runs a games company, Midlam Miniatures.

Awards
 2004: Won "Best British Independent Comic" National Comics Award for Solar Wind.
 2006: Nominated for "Best British Black and White Comic"  Eagle Award for Solar Wind

Notes

References

 "Great Scott!" - feature article, Judge Dredd Megazine #247 (July 2006), p. 46.

External links
Midlam Miniatures website

Interview at 2000AD Review
Omnvistascope Model 1 review, Comics Bulletin

British small press comics
Living people
Year of birth missing (living people)